Descendants of Cain is the fifth solo studio album by American rapper and record producer Kaseem "Ka" Ryan. It was released on May 1, 2020 via Iron Works Records. Recording session took place at Virtue & Vice Studios in Brooklyn. Production was handled by Ka himself and his frequent collaborators DJ Preservation, Animoss and Roc Marciano. It features a single guest appearance from Roc Marciano.

Critical reception

Descendants of Cain was met with widespread critical acclaim. At Metacritic, which assigns a normalized rating out of 100 to reviews from mainstream publications, the album received an average score of 85 based on four reviews. The aggregator Album of the Year has the critical consensus of the album at a 80 out of 100, based on 4 reviews.

AllMusic's David Crone wrote: "Descendants of Cain proves an exceptional listen. Pairing Ryan's sublime lyricism with organic production and a precisely constructed concept, the MC's fifth project is a superb statement piece from one of rap's most ingenious poets". Paul A. Thompson of Pitchfork wrote: "It includes some of the most striking writing of Ka's career—the knottier verses and the blunter ones, too—and is utterly immersive, whole lifetimes of fear and pain and death and regeneration condensed into 33 minutes". Tim Sentz of Beats Per Minute wrote: "He may do all of this DIY, but it comes across with more heart than a lot of the tourists of the scene, and it shows in his powerful lyrics just how far he's come in this world". Robert Christgau called the rapper "a matter-of-fact realist" who has "never been averse to recollection or commentary, and this album assumes a didactic stance he puts across", and went on to say:

In a song review for "Sins of The Father", Dan-O of Freemusicempire wrote: "...I was very pleased to have retained the thick poetic brilliance of Ka on his seventh album while getting a little more balanced mixture of production. Some beats like "P.R.A.Y." are specifically tailored to be jagged and shocking but "Old Justice" is among the most soulful and listenable beats Ka has ever made himself".

Accolades

Track listing

Personnel
Kaseem "Ka" Ryan – main artist, producer (tracks: 1, 3, 5-8, 10)
Rahkeim Calief Meyer – featured artist & producer (track 9)
Jean Daval – producer (tracks: 2, 11)
Willis "Animoss" Williams – producer (track 4)
Chris Pummill – recording
Charles Scott Harding – mixing
Michael Fossenkemper – mastering
Mark Shaw – design

References

2020 albums
Ka (rapper) albums
Albums produced by Roc Marciano